The Lute Player is a Russian fairy tale

The Lute Player may also refer to:
The Lute Player (Caravaggio), three paintings by Caravaggio 
The Lute Player (Cariani), a painting by Giovanni Cariani
The Lute Player (Orazio Gentileschi), a painting by Orazio Gentileschi
The Lute Player, a fictional painting by Artemisia Gentileschi, Orazio Gentileschi's daughter
Self-Portrait as a Lute Player, an actual painted by Artemisia Gentileschi
The Lute Player (Hals), a painting by Frans Hals
The Lute Player (Dirck van Baburen), painting
Lute Player, a painting by Valentin de Boulogne